Memorial Stadium is a multipurpose stadium located in Alice, Texas, United States. Its main use is as a football stadium for the Alice High School Coyotes.

Awards
The stadium won the Best Football Field Award by the Texas Turfgrass Association in 2007 and again in 2008.

Alice, Texas
High school football venues in Texas
Buildings and structures in Jim Wells County, Texas